Lynn S. Whiting (June 28, 1939 - April 19, 2017) was a trainer of Thoroughbred racehorses best known for his major upset win of the 1992 Kentucky Derby with the colt  Lil E. Tee. Raised in the business, he was the son of jockey and trainer Lyle S. Whiting.

References

	
1939 births
2017 deaths
American horse trainers
Sportspeople from Great Falls, Montana